Roubaix ( or ;) is a city in northern France, located in the Lille metropolitan area on the Belgian border. It is a historically mono-industrial commune in the Nord department, which grew rapidly in the 19th century from its textile industries, with most of the same characteristic features as those of English and American boom towns. This former new town has faced many challenges linked to deindustrialisation such as urban decay, with their related economic and social implications, since its major industries fell into decline by the middle of the 1970s. Located to the northeast of Lille, adjacent to Tourcoing, Roubaix is the chef-lieu of two cantons and the third largest city in the French region of Hauts-de-France ranked by population with nearly 99,000 inhabitants.

Together with the nearby cities of Lille, Tourcoing, Villeneuve-d'Ascq and eighty-six other communes, Roubaix gives structure to a four-centred metropolitan area inhabited by more than 1.1 million people: the European Metropolis of Lille. To a greater extent, Roubaix is in the center of a vast conurbation formed with the Belgian cities of Mouscron, Kortrijk and Tournai, which gave birth to the first European Grouping of Territorial Cooperation in January 2008, Lille–Kortrijk–Tournai with an aggregate population of over 2 million inhabitants.

Geography

Location 
Roubaix occupies a central position on the north-east slope of the Métropole Européenne de Lille: it is set on the eastern side of Lille and the southern side of Tourcoing, close to the Belgian border. As regards towns' boundaries, Roubaix is encompassed by seven cities which constitute its immediate neighbouring environment. These municipalities are namely: Tourcoing to the north and the northwest, Wattrelos to the northeast, Leers to the east, Lys-lez-Lannoy to the southeast, Hem to the south and Croix to the southwest and the west. Roubaix, alongside those municipalities and twenty-one other communes, belongs to the land of Ferrain, a little district of the former Castellany of Lille between the Lys and Scheldt rivers.

Geology 
The land upon which Roubaix stands belongs to the plain of Flanders. The Roubaisian area stretches on an east-west oriented shallow syncline axis which trends south-southeast to the Paleozoic limestone of the Mélantois-Tournaisis faulted anticline. It consists predominantly of Holocene alluvial sediment depositions. It is flat and low, with an elevation drop of only  over its .

Hydrology 
The Trichon stream fed by waters of the Espierre stream used to flow through the rural landscape of Roubaix before the industrialisation process began to alter this area in the middle of the 19th century. From that century on, the ensuing industries, with their increasing needs for reliable supplies of goods and water, led to the building of an inland waterway connected upstream from the Deûle and downstream to the Marque and Espierre toward the Scheldt, which linked directly Roubaix to Lille.

Opened in 1877, the Canal de Roubaix crosses the town from its northern neighbourhoods to its eastern neighbourhoods and partially flows along the city's boundaries. The Canal de Roubaix closed in 1985, after more than a century in use. Thank to the European funded project Blue Links, the waterway has been reopened to boating traffic since 2011.

Climate 
The area of the city is not known for undergoing unusual weather events. In regard to the town's geographical location and the results of the Météo-France's weather station of Lille-Lesquin, Roubaix is a temperate oceanic climate: while summer experiences mild temperatures, winter's temperatures may fall to below zero. Precipitation is infrequently intense.

Toponymy 
The current city's name is most likely derived from Frankish rausa "reed" and baki "brook". Therefore the meaning of Roubaix can, in all likelihood, find its origin on the banks of its three historical brooks: Espierre, Trichon and Favreuil. The place was mentioned for the first time in a Latinised form in the 9th century: Villa Rusbaci. Thereafter, the following names were in use:  1047 and 1106 Rubais, 1122 Rosbays, 1166 Rusbais, 1156 and 1202 Robais, 1223 Roubais. Over the span of centuries, the name evolved to Roubaix as shown on Mercator's map of Flanders published at Leuven in 1540.

Parallel to the official and usual name Roubaix, some translations are worth a mention. Firstly, though the city has never belonged to the Flemish-speaking area, the seldom-heard renderings Robeke and Roodebeeke are documented for Roubaix. Furthermore, the Dutch Language Union established Robaais as the city's proper Dutch name. Lastly, one can cite Rosbacum as the definite Latin transcription of Roubaix which has been in use since the 19th century, as recorded on dedication statements sealed in the first stones of the foundations of the City Hall laid in 1840 and the Church of Notre Dame laid in 1842.

History

Heraldry

People 
Inhabitants of Roubaix are known in English as "Roubaisians" and in French as Roubaisiens or in the feminine form Roubaisiennes, also natively called Roubaignots or in the feminine form Roubaignotes.

Demographics 

The evolution of the number of inhabitants is known through the population censuses carried out in the town since 1793 and the research study of Louis-Edmond Marissal, Clerk of the Peace of the city, published in 1844. Roubaix evolved into a provincial market town until the end of the Early modern period with a census population of 4,715 inhabitants in 1716. By the late 18th century, the city began to emerge as regional textile manufacturing centre and its population increased, reaching a level of 8,091 in 1800. As a result of the industrialisation process of the 19th century, the need of workers was supplied by rural flight as well as immigration. Belgian settlement was a feature of the Roubaisian life at that time.

During the first-half period of the 19th century, Roubaix ranked the first French town in terms of population growth rate with a five times increase, whereas in the remaining period of this century its population doubled. Within this last time framework, Belgian immigration appeared to be one of the major factor to explain the significantly high population growth, with 30,465 Belgian inhabitants counted in 1866 and 42,103 in 1872. Nonetheless, the rate of natural increase shew to be a more important component of the population growth in that period.

At the 20th century threshold, the Roubaisian population reached a peak of 124,661, from which it progressively declined over the successive
decades. Occupied by German troops from October 1914 to October 1918, Roubaix belonged to the combat zone of the Western Front during the First World War. Over this occupation period, Roubaisians suffered from dearth, deportation for compulsory labour and unusual casualties with a rather slight population drop from 122,723 to 113,265 between the 1911 and 1921 censuses.

The population of the city was 98,828 as of January 2019. This enables Roubaix to remain the third largest municipality in the region Hauts-de-France, after Lille and Amiens.

Languages 
Although the region of Roubaix was subjected many times to the domination of Flanders' rulers throughout its history, Roubaisians have used a local Picard variant as the language of everyday life for centuries. This spoken vernacular is locally known as Roubaignot. Until the early 20th century this patois prevailed. Therefore, French language progressive penetration into local culture should not only be analysed as a result of the industrialisation and urbanisation of the area but should also be considered in terms of public education policies.

Religion

Christianity 
The city of Roubaix is divided into six Catholic parishes and belongs to the deanery of the same name in the archdiocese of Lille.

Judaism 
In the aftermath of the Franco-Prussian War and the German annexation of Alsace-Lorraine, many Jews left their homes and emigrated. Jewish arrival in Roubaix derives from that bitter period of history. At the time, the new immigrant community, even though its small size, dedicated a building to Jewish faith and liturgical practises. The newly opened synagogue, located in a house at number 51 on the narrow rue des Champs, operated more than 60 years, until 1939, when it was closed under imprecise local circumstances as the Nazi regime took over in Europe. Despite the closure of the synagogue, the occupation and police raids, the local practise of Judaism saw a humble revival after the war which lasted until the start of the 1990s when the modest Jewry of Roubaix handed over its Sefer Torah to the care of the Jewish community of Lille. Roubaix has no longer been home to a Jewish place of worship since that event. The house inside which the first one was created 123 years ago, has been demolished since an urban renewal project occurred in 2000. On September 10, 2015, the mayor unveiled a commemorative plaque on the rue des Champs, as a tribute to the Roubaisian Jewry, in memory of the religious purpose of this previous building.

Islam 
As of August 2013 there were six mosques in the town, including one under construction. According to estimates by the mayor's office, around 20,000 people, or about 20 percent of the population were Muslims. Four areas of the cemetery were designated for Muslims.

Buddhism 
During the second half of the 20th century, the city took in Buddhist communities from originally Buddhist countries in the Southeast Asian peninsula including Cambodia, Laos, Thailand, and Vietnam. Within this background Roubaix has brought together two Buddhist traditions on its territory, hence cultural variations across communities: Mahāyāna and Theravāda with, respectively, one and four places of worship.

Urbanism

Urban geography 
During the Middle Age, the city grew in a northward-facing semicircle around its primitive core, beyond the area spread out between the church Saint Martin and the former fortified castle. The existence of this south boundary remained until the 18th century and marked an urban expansion which mainly occurred on the western and northern sides of the town. Increasing industrialisation, land transport improvement, continued population growth and the resulting need for suitable low cost lands for housing and manufacturing plants, all of which finally led to expand the city southward from the centre, in the 19th century.

Administrative and political affairs

Constituencies and cantons 
Roubaix grouped four cantons from 1988 to 2012. Since then, this number has fallen to two with Roubaix 1 and Roubaix 2. After the last redistricting of French legislative constituencies in 2010, the city is now divided into two constituencies: Nord's 7th constituency which include the former canton of Roubaix-Ouest and Nord's 8th constituency formed by the following former cantons: Roubaix-Centre, Roubaix-Nord and Roubaix-Est.

Administrative zoning

Eastern district neighbourhoods 
 Fraternité
 Pile
 Sainte-Elisabeth
 Sartel-Carihem
 Trois Ponts

Western district neighbourhoods 
 Epeule
 Fresnoy-Mackellerie
 Trichon

Central district neighbourhoods 
 Anseelme Motte-Bossut
 Barbieux
 Centre-ville
 Crouy
 Espérance
 Nations-Unies
 Vauban

Northern district neighbourhoods 
 Alma-Gare
 Armentières
 Cul de Four
 Entrepont
 Fosses aux Chênes
 Hommelet
 Hutin-Oran-Cartigny

Southern district neighbourhoods 
 Chemin Neuf
 Edouard Vaillant
 Hauts-Champs
 Justice
 Linné-Boulevards
 Moulin
 Nouveau Roubaix
 Petites-Haies
 Potennerie

Mayors of the city

International relations 

Roubaix is twinned with:

 Bradford, United Kingdom, since 1969
 Mönchengladbach, Germany, since 1969
 Verviers, Belgium, since 1969
 Skopje, North Macedonia, since 1973
 Prato, Italy, since 1981
 Sosnowiec, Poland, since 1993
 Covilhã, Portugal, since 2000
 Bouïra, Algeria, since 2003

Landmarks 

Remarkable buildings, old brick factories and warehouses abound in this once renowned city which was esteemed to be a worldwide textile capital in the early years of the 20th century. Thus, the city inherited one of the most architectural works in the French history and culture of the 19th century Industrial Revolution and was designated Town of Art and History on December 13, 2000. Ever since the Ministry of Culture endowed Roubaix with this label, the city has entered the 21st century by promoting its cultural standing as the inheritance of its industrial and social history.

Several profane or sacral buildings of Roubaix are registered as historic monuments.

Secular buildings registered as "monuments historiques"

Religious structures registered as "monuments historiques"

Sculptures and memorials 
The city has been the place where illustrious names of French sculptors put their skills to create memorial monuments since the end of the 19th century until the middle of the 20th century. After a long slack period 2010 introduced a shift in the genre with the unveiling of Wim Delvoye's Discobolos, a statue of modern art conceived as a welcoming sign to a neighbourhood of the city. The sculptures and memorial monuments in Roubaix which deserve notice for their historical or artistical interest are mentioned below.

 Discobolos: Wim Delvoye (sculptor), Bruno Dupont (mediator), Fondation de France and city of Roubaix (supporters), ordered by the neighbourhood residents with the members of the Hommelet neighbourhood committee and inaugurated on June 5, 2010
 Joan of Arc statue: Maxime Real del Sarte (sculptor), inaugurated on May 27, 1952
 Memorial to Jean-Baptiste Lebas: Albert de Jaeger (sculptor), funded through public subscription and inaugurated on October 23, 1949
 Memorial to Resistance Martyrs of Roubaix: Albert de Jaeger (sculptor), engraved "Roubaix a ses martyrs de la Résistance" and "Ils ont brisé les chaînes de l'oppression", ordered by the City council and inaugurated on November 11, 1948
 Memorial to Eugène Motte: Raoul Bénard (sculptor), Gustave Poubel (architect), funded through public subscription and inaugurated on September 22, 1935
 Memorial to Jean-Joseph Weerts: Alexandre Descatoire (sculptor), ordered by the City council and inaugurated on October 29, 1931
 Memorial to Louis Bossut: Maxime Real del Sarte (sculptor), ordered by the City council and inaugurated on October 4, 1925
 Monuments aux Morts or World War I Memorial of Roubaix: Alexandre Descatoire (sculptor), Jean-Frédéric Wielhorski (architect), engraved "Roubaix à ses enfants morts pour la défense du pays et pour la paix", ordered by the City council and inaugurated on October 18, 1925
 Memorial to Jules Guesde: Georgette Agutte-Sembat (sculptor), Albert Bührer (architect), funded through public subscription and inaugurated on April 12, 1925
 Memorial to Amédée Prouvost: Hippolyte Lefèbvre (sculptor), ordered by the City council and inaugurated on October 29, 1922
 Memorial to Pierre Destombes: Corneille Theunissen (sculptor), engraved "Hortorum, Musicae, Librorumque, Studiosus", ordered by the City council and inaugurated on October 29, 1922
 Memorial to Gustave Nadaud: Alphonse-Amédée Cordonnier (sculptor), Gustave Leblanc-Barbedienne (art founder), inaugurated on October 11, 1896

Culture

Museums 
Roubaix has been home to two major museums of the region Hauts-de-France since the beginning of the 21st century: La Piscine and La Manufacture; inheriting both of the local socioeconomic history. La Piscine, also known as the Musée d'Art & d'Industrie André Diligent, is one of the most lauded cultural attractions in northern France. This museum is housed in the Art Deco-style former swimming pool of Roubaix, a building remodelled in 2000 to accommodate and exhibit 19th and 20th century collections of the city. After being closed for two years of renovation works and extension, it was reopened to the public in October 2018, becoming more successful than ever before. La Manufacture is the reference textile museum in northern France. It is hosted in an old weaving factory.

Painting 
The most prestigious names of painters, who made their reputation in Roubaix from the middle of the 19th century to the early 20th century are Jean-Joseph Weerts and Rémy Cogghe.

From the end of the Second World War to the beginning of the 1970s, a casual group of young artists from Roubaix and the surrounding region was formed and given the name Groupe de Roubaix. Two painters commonly associated with the group are Arthur Van Hecke and Eugène Leroy.

Fashion 
Anxious to restore the prestige of northern France's textile industry and operating under the label of Maisons de Mode, the cities of Lille and Roubaix have created spaces for new fashion designers to thrive since 2007. The Roubaisian location, next to La Piscine museum, is known as Le Vestiaire. There are fifteen boutiques and fashion studios housed in an old industrial building.

Theatre and performing arts centres 

 Centre chorégraphique national Roubaix - Hauts-de-France
 Colisée
 Condition publique
 Théâtre de l'Oiseau-Mouche "Le Garage"
 Théâtre Louis Richard
 Théâtre Pierre de Roubaix

Cinema 
The city of Roubaix was the filming location (mostly or partly) of the following films:

 I Am a Soldier (French: Je suis un soldat), directed by Laurent Larivière in 2015
 My Golden Days (French: Trois souvenirs de ma jeunesse), directed by Arnaud Desplechin in 2015
 Discount, directed by Louis-Julien Petit in 2014
 Queens of the Ring (French: Les Reines du ring), directed by Jean-Marc Rudnicki in 2013
 Blue Is the Warmest Colour (French: La Vie d'Adèle – Chapitres 1 & 2), directed by Abdellatif Kechiche in 2013
 A Christmas Tale (French: Un conte de Noël), directed by Arnaud Desplechin in 2008
 The Banishment (Russian: Изгнание, Izgnanie), directed by Andrey Zvyagintsev in 2007
 In His Hands (French: Entre ses mains), directed by Anne Fontaine in 2005
 The Axe (French: Le couperet), directed by Costa-Gavras in 2005
 Save Me (French: Sauve-Moi), directed by Christian Vincent in 2000
 Flat Land Cities (French: Les Cités de la plaine), directed by Robert Kramer in 1999
 The Dreamlife of Angels (French: La Vie rêvée des anges), directed by Erick Zonca in 1998
 Enigma, directed by Jeannot Szwarc in 1982
 Life Is a Long Quiet River (French: La vie est un long fleuve tranquille), directed by Étienne Chatiliez in 1988
 Hurricane Rosy (Italian: Temporale Rosy, French: Rosy la bourrasque), directed by Mario Monicelli in 1979
 Swimming Instructor (French: Le Maître-nageur), directed by Jean-Louis Trintignant in 1979
 Body of My Enemy (French: Le Corps de mon ennemi), directed by Henri Verneuil in 1976
 A Sunday in Hell (Danish: En Forårsdag i Helvede), Danish documentary directed by Jørgen Leth in 1976
 The Confession (French: L'Aveu), directed by Costa Gavras in 1970
 Struggle in Italy (Italian: Lotte in Italia), directed by the Dziga Vertov Group in 1970

Higher education 
 The EDHEC Business School is one of the few Grandes École located outside the Paris Metropolitan Area. It is one of Europe's fastest rising business schools.
 ENSAIT is a higher education and research institute, gathering all the disciplines related to textiles.
 ESAAT is a design education institute.
 Decentralisation of the Universities of Lille II and Lille III

Libraries 
 Médiathèque "La Grand'Plage"
 National Archives of the World of Work

Sport 
Roubaix has an old sporting heritage and is home to the finishing of one of the world's oldest races of professional road cycling at its velodrome: Paris–Roubaix, known as the Hell of the North. While Roubaix is famous for its velodrome, there is more to this city than the cycling sports facilities.

The building of indoor and outdoor sports amenities in the city should be associated with its era of economic rise during the industrial revolution, in addition to the development of local sporting clubs and associations.

In October 2021 Roubaix hosted the 2021 UCI Track Cycling World Championships.

Economy 
During the 19th century, Roubaix acquired an international reputation for textile industry and wool production. In the 1970s and 1980s, international competition and automation caused an industrial decline and resulted in the closure of many factories. From that moment on and since the implementation of the French urban policy in the early 1980s, around three-fourths of the town's territory has been regularly assigned specific zoning designations as well as health and welfare plans.

Roubaix's high level of unemployment is a consequence of the desindustrialisation. The town is listed among France's poorest cities.
Successive local governments have tried to address difficulties associated with deindustrialisation by attracting new industries, making the most of the town's cultural credentials and organising a strong student presence on different campuses. While undergoing conversion efforts, the city is experimenting with new models and able to take advantage of successful economic stories, with online retail and information technology, and seems to be on the way to reverse the decades of decline.

Textile industry 
Nowadays, local textile companies are focussing on developing high-tech textile products.

Commerce and services 
Mail order companies of international renown such as La Redoute, Damart and 3 Suisses, stemmed from textile industries which were founded in Roubaix. Showroomprive.com has been locally established since 2016 as an e-commerce company that specialises in online flash sales.

Information technology and e-business 
OVH was created in Roubaix in 1999 and became a global IT infrastructure company, creating more than thousand jobs in the city and surroundings. Its head office is still in Roubaix.
Ankama Games has established its head office in Roubaix since 2007.
 Blanchemaille, an e-commerce cluster helped by the incubator EuraTechnologies, has been established in the former building of La Redoute in Roubaix since 2014.

Infrastructure

Transportation 

A22 autoroute, a French part of the European route E17 from Burgundy to Antwerp, is the only motorway, within a motorway roads network of the highest density in France after Paris, which passes by Roubaix.

The Gare de Roubaix railway station offers connections to Antwerp, Lille, Ostend, Paris and Tourcoing.

The city is also served by the Lille Metro.

Environmental perspectives 
Throughout the 1970s and 1980s desindustrialisation dramatically influenced major urban landscapes across the arrondissement of Lille. Large areas of brownfield land came to mark the city of Roubaix. With the support of the local and national government programs, these areas are acquired and gradually restored or rebuilt.

Roubaix has one of the most efficient biomass district heating plant in France and is therefore among the most advanced cities for sustainability in Hauts-de-France. Since 2014, the city has been engaged in several related initiatives aimed at moving to a circular economy and a zero waste future.

Notable people

Artists 
 Jean-Robert de Cavel (September 12, 1961 – December 23, 2022): Chef. 

Wanani Gradi Mariadi (1990–): rapper known as Gradur
 Kaddour Hadadi (1976–): singer and author known as HK
 Philippe Dhondt (1965–): singer, songwriter and composer known as Boris
 Arnaud Desplechin (1960–): film director
 Édouard Devernay (1889–1952): Organist, composer
 Wladyslaw Znorko (1958–2013): theatre author and director
 Philippe Barraqué (1954–): musicologist, music therapist, composer and singer
 Étienne Chatiliez (1952–): film director
 Roger Delmotte (1925–): classical trumpeter
 Philippe Lefebvre (1949–): musician, principal organist of Notre Dame Cathedral of Paris
 Chantal Ladesou (1948–): actress and comedian
 Agnès Guillemot (1931–2005): film editor
 Pierre Jansen (1930–2015): film music composer
 Jenny Clève (1930–): actress
 Elisabeth Yvonne Scatcherd (1928–): film actress known as Yvonne Furneaux
 Charles Gadenne (1925–2012): sculptor
 Georges Delerue (1925–1992): composer who worked on over 350 scores for cinema and television
 Arthur Van Hecke (1924–2003): painter
 Gabrielle Vervaecke (1921–2005): composer and singer known as Gaby Verlor
 Viviane Romance (1912–1991): actress
 Albert de Jaeger (1908–1992): sculptor, printmaker, medallist and smelter
 Charles Bodart-Timal (1897–1971): songwriter and chansonnier
 Jules Gressier (1897–1960): conductor
 Francis Bousquet (1890–1942): Marseille-born composer
 Léon Mathot (1886–1968): film actor and director
 Silas Broux (1867–1957): painter
 Jean-Joseph Weerts (1846–1927): painter
 Rémy Cogghe (1846–1927): Belgian-born painter who resided in Roubaix
 Gustave Nadaud (1820–1893): songwriter and chansonnier

Athletes 
 Wassim Aouachria (2000–): football player
 Ahmed Touba (1998–): football player
 Moussa Niakhate (1996–): football player
 Christoffer Mafoumbi (1994–): goalkeeper
 Saoussen Boudiaf (1993–): sabre fencer
 Anthony Knockaert (1991–): football player
 Aliou Dia (1990–): football player
 Antoine Roussel (1989–): ice hockey player
 Pierrick Gunther (1989–): rugby union player
 Idir Ouali (1988–): football player
 Martial Mbandjock (1985–): sprinter
 Seïd Khiter (1985–): football player
 Daouda Sow (1983–): boxer
 Yero Dia (1982–): football player
 Icham Mouissi (1982–): Algerian football player
 David Coulibaly (1978–): football player
 Arnaud Tournant (1978–): track cyclist
 Christophe Landrin (1977–): football midfielder
 Jacques-Olivier Paviot (1976–): football player
 Fatiha Ouali (1974–): race walker
 Michel Breistroff (1971–1996): ice hockey player
 Pierre Dréossi (1959–): former football player, coach and football manager
 Alain Bondue (1959–): racing cyclist
 Jean-Christian Lang (1950–): football manager and former player
 Jacques Carette (1947–): athlete
 René Libeer (1934–2006): boxer
 Jacques Pollet (1922–1997): racing driver
 Jacques Leenaert (1921–2004): football player
 Prudent Joye (1913–1980): track and field athlete
 Georges Beaucourt (1912–2002): football player
 Raymond Dubly (1893–1988): football player
 Jean Alavoine (1888–1943): cyclist
 Charles Crupelandt (1886–1955): Wattrelos-born professional road bicycle racer
 Arthur Balbaert (1879–1938): Belgian sports shooter

Politicians and professionals 
 Karima Delli (1979–): politician, Member of the European Parliament
 Florence Morlighem (1970–): politician, Member of Parliament
 Olivier Henno (1962–): politician, mayor of Saint-André-lez-Lille and general councillor
 Benoît Duquesne (1957–2014): journalist, television reporter and newscaster
 Pierre Pribetich (1956–): politician, former Member of the European Parliament
 Marie-Christine Blandin (1952–): politician, member of the Senate of France, representing the Nord department
 Jean-Luc Brunin (1951–): clergyman, bishop of the Roman Catholic Diocese of Le Havre
 Alex Türk (1950–): politician, member of the Senate of France, representing the Nord department
 Bernard Arnault (1949–): business magnate, investor and art collector
 Bruno Masure (1947–): journalist, news anchor and television presenter
 Auguste Mimerel (1786–1871), industrialist and politician
 Gérard Mulliez (1931–): businessman, founder of the Auchan chain of department stores
 Robert Diligent (1924–2014): journalist, founding members of Télé Luxembourg
 Francis Pollet (1964-): general officer
 André Diligent (1919–2002): lawyer and politician, World War II resistance activist, deputy to the National Assembly, senator-mayor of Roubaix
 Marcel Verfaillie (1911–1945): communist militant, World War II resistance activist against Nazism, died in concentration camp
 Pierre Herman (1910–1990): politician, deputy to the National Assembly
 Pierre Pflimlin (1907–2000): lawyer and politician, last Prime Minister of the Fourth Republic
 Raymond Schmittlein (1904–1974): toponymist and politician, deputy to the National Assembly
 Jean-Baptiste Lebas (1898–1944): politician, mayor of Roubaix, deputy to the National Assembly, World War I and II resistance activist, died in deportation custody
 Antoine Cordonnier (1892–1918): military aviator, flying ace during World War I
 Jules Dumont (1888–1943): communist militant, commanded the Commune de Paris Battalion, a unit part of the XI International Brigade
 Jean Prouvost (1885–1978): businessman, media owner and politician
 Agnello van den Bosch (1883–1945): Belgian Catholic Franciscan priest (OFM), founder and president of the Belgian National Work for the Blind, died in concentration camp
 Louis Loucheur (1872–1931): writer and politician, deputy to the National Assembly
 Ferdinand Bonnel (1865–1945): Jesuit priest and missionary in Sri Lanka
 Théodore Vienne (1864–1921): textile manufacturer and co-founder of Paris–Roubaix cycle race
 Eugène Motte (1860–1932): politician and businessman, mayor of Roubaix, deputy to the National Assembly
 Pierre Wibaux (1858–1913): cattle-rancher, banker and gold-mine owner, emigrated from France to the United States
 Jules Guesde (1845–1922): Paris-born socialist journalist and politician, deputy of the constituency of Roubaix to the National Assembly
 Jean Desbouvrie (c. 1840–1847-?): inventor and bird tamer
 Gérard Vachonfrance (1933–2008): physician and society co-founder
Marie Léonie Vanhoutte (1888–1967): French resistance fighter and secret-agent during World War I.

Scientists 
 Stanislas Dehaene (1965–): cognitive psychologist, professor at the Collège de France and author
 Bernard Amadei (1954–): professor of civil engineering at the University of Colorado, founder of Engineers Without Borders (USA)
 Dominique Mulliez (1952–): epigrapher, archaeologist and Hellenist
 Marguerite Dupire (1920–2015): ethnologist
 Robert Jonckhèere (1888–1974): astronomer
 Joseph Willot (1875–1919): pharmacist and World War I resistance activist

Writers 
 Marie Desplechin (1959–): writer and journalist
 Pierre Pierrard (1920–2005): historian
 Michel Décaudin (1919–2004): Romance linguist, literature professor and author
 Richard Cobb (1917–1996): British social historian. Lived in Roubaix in the 1940s.
 Octave Vandekerkhove (1911–1987): writer
 Maxence Van Der Meersch (1907–1951): writer
 Maurice Nédoncelle (1905–1976): personalist philosopher
 Yanette Delétang-Tardif (1902–1976): poet
 Amédée Prouvost (1877–1909): poet
 Jules Feller (1859–1940): Romance linguist and philologist, Belgian academician and Walloon militant

See also 
 Paris–Roubaix
 André Diligent Museum of Art and Industry
 Canal of Roubaix
 Roubaix, South Dakota
 André Bizette-Lindet

Notes and references

Notes

References

Bibliography

External links 

 Tourist office website 
 Website of the museum of art and industry 
 LeBlog2Roubaix.Com (videoblog and WebTv about Roubaix) 
  

 
Communes of Nord (French department)
French Flanders